Murder City: Detroit - 100 Years of Crime and Violence is a 2008 film which chronicles the story of gang violence in Detroit over the past 100 years and how it has affected the fabric of one of the oldest cities in the midwest. Murder City is filmed documentary style and chronicles the cities notorious criminal past. The stories of Detroit's notorious criminals are interspersed with real life drug stories in the film. Detroit legendary music artist Seven the General stars in the film and sheds light his history and ties with Young Boys Inc. Along with retired police officers, and "others tell their crime stories on film. They chronicle losing loved ones to violence, as well as their own experiences. The real life stories add a humanizing element."

Released nationally and directed by Alan "Al Profit" Bradley the film is stored in collegiate libraries and used by professors at the University of Michigan and Michigan State University as a reference tool for class course work.

Cast

"Seven the General"
"Ziploc Moe
"Motsi Ski
"Alex Thomas"
"Roy Houston"
"Manno"
"Everett Taylor"
"Ice"
"Fred Rocquemore"
"Paul Howard"

References

External links

Warren, Tamara. "Moviemaker makes a statement about crime in Detroit." Detroit Free Press. May 11, 2008.

Documentary films about gangs in the United States
Crime in Detroit
Direct-to-video documentary films
2008 films
2008 documentary films
Films set in Detroit
Documentary films about Detroit
Films shot in Michigan
2000s English-language films